Taylor Woodrow  was one of the largest housebuilding and general construction companies in Britain. It was listed on the London Stock Exchange and was a constituent of the FTSE 100 Index until its merger with rival George Wimpey to create Taylor Wimpey on 3 July 2007.

History

Early years
Frank Taylor was working in the family fruit wholesaling business in Blackpool when, in 1921, at the age of 16, he persuaded his father that he could build a house for them to live in. With some capital from his father and a loan from the bank, Frank Taylor built a pair of semi-detached houses, selling one at a good profit. It was only after financing Taylor's growing housebuilding work for another two years that the bank manager realised that his client was under the legal age for conveying land and uncle Jack Woodrow was brought into the business, creating the Taylor Woodrow name.

In 1930, Frank Taylor moved down from Blackpool to London where Taylor Woodrow rapidly expanded the scale of its private housebuilding – by the mid-1930s it was building at a rate of 1,200-1,500 houses a year. The company built over 1,000 houses at Grange Park in Hayes and set up its headquarters on Adrienne Avenue in Southall.

In 1935, the various housebuilding companies were amalgamated and floated on the London Stock Exchange as Taylor Woodrow Estates. In 1937, Taylor Woodrow Construction was formed and, after a modest start, the company was soon engaged in defence work. With the outbreak of war in 1939, all private housing development stopped. For six years Taylor Woodrow built military camps, airfields and factories culminating in work on the Mulberry harbour units.

Post war
By the end of the war, Taylor Woodrow had become a substantial construction business. The expertise was now turned to civil construction work at home and the start of what was to become the group's international business. The first overseas construction was in East Africa where, amongst other things, Taylor Woodrow was involved in the notorious Groundnut Scheme. Later moves were into west and South Africa and, in the 1950s, Taylor Woodrow expanded into Australia, Canada (including housing) and, most important of all, the middle east.

At home, Taylor Woodrow Construction engaged in a wide variety of work, both for the private and public sectors, but what stood out was its role in the United Kingdom power generation industry: after a string of conventional power stations, the company was the contractor for the world's first commercial nuclear power station, Calder Hall, followed by Hartlepool, Hinkley Point A, Wylfa and Sizewell A. In the private sector, notable contracts included terminal buildings at Heathrow Airport and the Liverpool Metropolitan Cathedral.

Taylor Woodrow's original private housebuilding business was not neglected. Once building controls were abolished, Taylor Woodrow, (in the shape of Taywood Homes), responded rapidly and by 1956 sales were back to their best pre-war levels. However, with Frank Taylor running an international construction business, yet still controlling site purchases himself, Taywood Homes never benefited from the post-war housing boom; indeed, housing sales actually declined, and at the beginning, of the 1980s Taywood Homes was still only building around 500 to 600 houses a year.

Largely as a result of its middle east presence, Taylor Woodrow's international construction business went from strength to strength and by the mid-1970s overseas profits accounted for two thirds of group profits. The centrepiece was the joint venture with Costain to build the dry docks at Port Rashid Dubai, described as "the largest single overseas contract ever undertaken by the British construction industry".

However, by the 1980s, middle east construction was declining but a new source of growth had taken over – commercial property development. Taylor Woodrow had entered the commercial property market in 1964, its flagship project being the St Katharine Docks complex. By 1989, almost 60% of group profits was coming from rents, development profits, and the sale of long-term investment properties.

Private housing revival
The collapse of the property boom led to exceptional write offs of more than £100 million in 1991 and 1992. At the same time, few in the construction industry were making substantial profits. Gradually, Taylor Woodrow's construction business was reduced in size and the emphasis of the group was redirected to private housing – both in the United Kingdom and North America. In March 1994, Taywood Homes was strengthened, by the acquisition of Heron Homes taking its sales to an annual rate of 1,000, while overseas the success of its United States and Canadian subsidiaries gave the group an extra 2,000 a year sales. By the end of the 1990s, Taylor Woodrow was describing itself as an international housing and property group. The last major civil engineering contract had been as part of the Channel Tunnel consortium (completed in 1994) and although there were still substantial building contracts, including the National Assembly for Wales (2006), construction was on the way out.

In January 2001, Taylor Woodrow intervened in the proposed merger of Bryant–Beazer, buying Bryant for £632 million in cash and shares. Adding Bryant's annual sales of 4,000 to Taywood's 2,000 immediately elevated Taylor Woodrow to one of the United Kingdom's top five housebuilders. Taywood's housing was relocated to Bryant's Birmingham office, and rebranded under the Bryant name. Two years later the housing business was again enlarged, this time by the acquisition of Wilson Connolly, taking output to approaching 10,000 units a year.

Merger with George Wimpey
In March 2007, the company announced plans for a £6 billion nil premium merger with George Wimpey. The merger was effected by means of a scheme of arrangement, leaving the original Taylor Woodrow shareholders with 51% of the new Taylor Wimpey. Taylor Woodrow provided the new chairman and finance director, while the chief executive and the United Kingdom managing director came from Wimpey.

Taylor Woodrow Construction
In September 2008, Vinci plc, the British subsidiary of France's Vinci SA, acquired Taylor Woodrow Construction from Taylor Wimpey for £74m. Today Taylor Woodrow Construction is a UK-based civil engineering contractor, one of four operating divisions of Vinci Construction UK. The business was launched in 2011, combining civil engineering operations from the former Taylor Woodrow group and from Vinci UK – formerly Norwest Holst.

References

External links
Taylor Wimpey plc 

Construction and civil engineering companies of the United Kingdom
Construction and civil engineering companies established in 1921
Housebuilding companies of the United Kingdom
Companies formerly listed on the London Stock Exchange
Defunct companies based in London
1921 establishments in England
British companies established in 1921
Manufacturing companies established in 1921
Technology companies established in 1921
Construction and civil engineering companies disestablished in 2007
British companies disestablished in 2007
Manufacturing companies disestablished in 2007
Technology companies disestablished in 2007